Xenonectriella is a genus of lichenicolous fungi in the family Nectriaceae. The genus was circumscribed by lichenologist Josef Karl Weese in 1919, with Xenonectriella lutescens assigned as the type species.

Species
Xenonectriella aurantiaca 
Xenonectriella calabrica 
Xenonectriella coppinsiana 
Xenonectriella dirinariae 
Xenonectriella fissuriprodiens 
Xenonectriella humilis 
Xenonectriella leptaleoides 
Xenonectriella lutescens 
Xenonectriella nephromatis  – Alaska
Xenonectriella ornamentata 
Xenonectriella protopannariae 
Xenonectriella rosea 
Xenonectriella rugulatispora 
Xenonectriella septemseptata 
Xenonectriella streimannii 
Xenonectriella subimperspicua 
Xenonectriella vertebrata

References

Nectriaceae
Nectriaceae genera
Taxa described in 1919
Lichenicolous fungi